Firat Ezel Filiz (born ) is a Turkish male volleyball player. He is part of the Turkey men's national volleyball team. On club level he plays for Inegöl Belediyesi.

References

External links
 profile at FIVB.org

1988 births
Living people
Turkish men's volleyball players
Place of birth missing (living people)
21st-century Turkish people